Fred Jordan may refer to:

 Fred Jordan (baseball coach) (born c. 1958), college baseball coach
 Fred Jordan (singer) (1922–2002), English singer
 Fred Jordan (publisher) (1925–2021), Grove Press, Evergreen Review
 Fred Jordan (politician) (born 1974), member of the Oklahoma House of Representatives